Decussata is a genus of butterflies in the family Lycaenidae. It is a junior synonym of Ostrinotes Johnson, Austin, Le Crom & Salazar, 1997

References
Robert K. Robbins and Gerardo Lamas, 2002 Nomenclatural Changes in the Neotropical Eumaeini(Lepidoptera, Lycaenidae, Theclinae) Revista Brasileira de Zoologia vol.19  supl.1 Curitiba July 2002 

Lycaenidae
Lycaenidae genera